Geoffroy Lejeune (born 3 September 1988) is a French journalist. He is the editor-in-chief of Valeurs actuelles, a French conservative political magazine.

Early life
Geoffroy Lejeune was born on 3 September 1988. He graduated from the École supérieure de journalisme de Paris in 2011.

Career
Lejeune began his career in journalism for Le Point. He became the political editor of Valeurs actuelles in 2015 and its editor-in-chief in 2016. He became the youngest editor-in-chief in France. As editor, he covered the whole spectrum of right-wing politics, from the far right to the centre right. He also hired several young journalists, with a focus on investigative journalism. In April 2017, he derided Le Monde, France's left-wing newspaper of record, for launching Decodex, a fact-checking app, and he suggested Valeurs actuelles should start fact-checking Le Monde.

Lejeune is the author of a political novel (Une élection ordinaire) in which conservative essayist Éric Zemmour is elected as the President of France.

Works

References

1988 births
Living people
French male journalists
21st-century French journalists
French male novelists
21st-century French novelists
21st-century French male writers
École supérieure de journalisme de Paris alumni
Writers from Avignon